Exobasidium is a genus of fungi in the family Exobasidiaceae. The genus has a widespread distribution, especially in northern temperate regions, and contains about 50 species. Many of the species in this genus are plant pathogens that grow on Ericaceae. The comprising fungi are parasitic in nature, especially on various heath plants where they cause galls.

Species
 Exobasidium burtii
 Exobasidium cassandrae
 Exobasidium karstenii
 Exobasidium reticulatum
 Exobasidium rhododendri
 Exobasidium splendidum
 Exobasidium vaccinii (Fuckel) Woronin
 Exobasidium vaccinii-uliginosi
 Exobasidium vexans

References

Ustilaginomycotina